John II of Brienne (died 11 July 1302 in Kortrijk) was the son of John I of Brienne, Count of Eu and Beatrice of Saint-Pol. He succeeded his father as Count of Eu in 1294.

He married Jeanne, Countess of Guînes (d. 1331 or 1332), the daughter and heir of Baldwin IV, Count of Guînes. They had two children:
 Raoul I of Brienne, Count of Eu
 Marie, d. young

John was killed at the Battle of the Golden Spurs.

References

Sources

Year of birth missing
1302 deaths
Brienne, John II of
French military personnel killed in action
House of Brienne